Knall and Fall as Detectives is a 1953 Austrian-West German comedy film directed by Hans Heinrich and starring Hans Richter, Rudolf Carl, and Ingrid Lutz. It was made as a sequel to the 1952 film Knall and Fall as Imposters. It was shot at the Spandau Studios in Berlin. The film's sets were designed by the art director Rolf Zehetbauer.

Cast

References

External links

1953 comedy films
Austrian comedy films
German comedy films
West German films
Films directed by Hans Heinrich
Austrian sequel films
German sequel films
Films scored by Hans Lang
Buddy comedy films
Austrian black-and-white films
German black-and-white films
1950s German films
Films shot at Spandau Studios